Araneus praesignis is a species of orb-weaving spider found in Queensland, Australia where it is widespread and common in well-vegetated areas. The Atlas of Living Australia shows a record from New South Wales. It has bold black blobs on its rear, perhaps mimicking eyes. In 2014 Carly Brooke Martinetti gave it the common name "Alien Butt Spider" by which it became internationally known. Due to its memorable common name and strange appearance photographs of the spider have appeared in many online blogs and galleries.  The purported 2015 sighting from China  is of a different species of orb weaver because it has a different pattern of dark patches on the back and the photo does not show the actual alien eyes from which the common name is derived.

Description and taxonomy
Both males ( body length 5 mm) and females (7 mm) of Araneus praesignis have large black decorations on the upper rear (dorsal posterior) of the abdomen, thought to be a case of Batesian mimicry where an animal has markings making it appear larger and more threatening than it really is. The spider was described by Ludwig Koch in Die Arachniden Australiens, 1872.

Biology

Araneus praesignis shelters during the day in a silk-bound retreat made in a non-fully-closed leaf nearby where its web is erected at night. Its food is night-flying insects and other invertebrates. It is harmless to humans and can be handled by people without medical consequences although allergic reactions may be possible.

References

Araneus
Spiders described in 1872
Spiders of Australia